Sazaman-e Reza Ajdadi (also Romanized as Sāzamān-e Rez̤ā Ājdādī) is a village in Meyami Rural District, Meyami District, Shahrud County, Semnan Province, Iran. At the 2006 census, its population was 19, in 5 families.

References 

Populated places in Shahrud County